Lê Quang Khải (born 2 September 1952) is a Vietnamese Olympic middle-distance runner. He represented his country in the men's 1500 meters at the 1980 Summer Olympics. He competed in heat 3 and finished 10th out of 10 runners. His time was a 4:06.80.

References

External links
 

1952 births
Living people
Vietnamese male middle-distance runners
Olympic athletes of Vietnam
Athletes (track and field) at the 1980 Summer Olympics